Tokimeki is the romanization of the Japanese term ときめき which can mean excitement or heartbeat. It can refer to:
Tokimeki Tonight, a manga/anime series that began in 1982
Tokimeki Alice, a manga by Hideo Azuma that ran from 1985 to 2006
Nakayama Miho no Tokimeki High School, a 1987 dating sim
Tokimeki Memorial (video game), the first of a dating sim series that began in 1994
Tokimeki Couple, a 1996 manga series by Mariko Kubota produced in Manga Life
Sailor Moon Sailor Stars Tokimeki Party, a 1997 release by Sega Pico in list of party video games
Tokimeki, a December 1999 comedic song by  produced by Key Party Records and released by Enamell Records
Tokimeki Momoiro High School, a May 2002 manga series by Chiharu Sasano (also in Manga Life)
, a December 2002 retelling of Tokimeki Tonight
Tokimeki DREAMing!!!, a 2008 song in "Shokugyō: Idol"
Tokimeki no Rumba, an August 2009 single released by singer Kiyoshi Hikawa
Kaitō Tenshi Twin Angel: Tokimeki Paradise!!, a 2011 anime adaptation of a 2007 manga
Tokimeki Crisis is a video game in the series Kamen Rider Ex-Aid
Tokimeki/Tonari no Onna, is a 2015 double A-side single by Chatmonchy
Made in Tokimeki, the ending song by the unit Ra*bits from the franchise Ensemble Stars!
Tokimeki Runners, the first song sung by the unit Nijigasaki High School Idol Club from the franchise Love Live!